Albert–Daly Field is a  multi-use sports facility used for Men's and Women's Soccer as well as Women's Lacrosse located in Williamsburg, Virginia on the campus of the College of William and Mary. It is home to the soccer and lacrosse teams for the college.

The facility was paid for thanks in large part to a sizable challenge grant made by Jim and Bobbie Ukrop.  The Ukrops suggested that the field be named in honor of long time soccer coaches Al Albert and John Daly.  Opened in 2004, the original venue consisted of a natural grass playing surface, lighting, and temporary bleacher seating.
In 2010, the college broke ground on a new 1,000-seat spectator pavilion at Albert–Daly Field.  The structure, Martin Family Stadium, is named in honor of Eff and Patty Martin, and their children.  In addition to spectator seating, the building has a press box, filming positions, and restroom facilities. The project was completed in the spring of 2011.

References

2004 establishments in Virginia
College soccer venues in the United States
Soccer venues in Virginia
Sports venues completed in 2004
Sports venues in Hampton Roads
William & Mary Tribe soccer
William & Mary Tribe sports venues
Defunct National Premier Soccer League stadiums